Wake Up! Wake Up! Wake Up! is an album that was released by The Pillows on May 2, 2007.

Track listing
 "Wake up! Dodo"
 "Youngster (Kent Arrow)"
 "Propose" (プロポーズ)
 "Scarecrow" (スケアクロウ)
 "Boat House"
 "The Pleasure Song" (プレジャー・ソング)
 "Serious Plan" (シリアス・プラン)
 "Skinny Blues"
 "Private Kingdom" (プライベート・キングダム)
 "Century Creepers (Voice of the Proteus)"
 "Sweet Baggy Days"

References

The Pillows albums
2007 albums